The 2011 NCAA Division I Men's Golf Championship was a golf tournament contested from May 31 to June 5, 2011 at the Karsten Creek Golf Club in Stillwater, Oklahoma and was hosted by Oklahoma State University. It was the 73rd NCAA Division I Men's Golf Championship. The team championship was won by the Augusta State Jaguars who won their second consecutive national championship by defeating the Georgia Bulldogs in the championship match play round 3–2. The individual national championship was won by John Peterson from Louisiana State University.

Venue

This was the second NCAA Division I Men's Golf Championship, and the first since 2003, held at the Karsten Creek Golf Club in Stillwater, Oklahoma. It was the third NCAA tournament hosted by Oklahoma State University in 1973, 2003, 2011.

Team competition

Leaderboard
Par, single-round: 288
Par, total: 864
The top eight teams advanced to the match play portion of the tournament.

Rest of the Field: USC (895), Texas (895), Alabama (896), Arkansas (897), San Diego (898), San Diego State (898), Arizona State (899), California (902), Kent State (902), LSU (905), Northwestern (906), Florida (908), Tennessee (910), Pepperdine (919), Kennesaw State (921), NC State (921), Oklahoma (930), Arizona (933), Colorado State (937)

Match play bracket

References

NCAA Men's Golf Championship
Golf in Oklahoma
NCAA Division I Men's Golf Championship
NCAA Division I Men's Golf Championship
NCAA Division I Men's Golf Championships
NCAA Division I Men's Golf Championship
NCAA Division I Men's Golf Championship